Quinate dehydrogenase (quinone) (NAD(P)+-independent quinate dehydrogenase, quinate:pyrroloquinoline-quinone 5-oxidoreductase) is an enzyme with systematic name quinate:quinol 3-oxidoreductase. This enzyme catalyses the following chemical reaction

 quinate + quinone  3-dehydroquinate + quinol

This enzyme is membrane-bound.

References

External links 
 

EC 1.1.5